Pak Sin Il is a male former international table tennis player from North Korea.

He won a bronze medal at the 1965 World Table Tennis Championships in the Swaythling Cup (men's team event) with Jung Kil-Hwa, Jung Ryang-Woong, Kim Chang-Ho and Kim Jung-Sam.

Two years later he won a silver medal at the 1967 World Table Tennis Championships in the Swaythling Cup (men's team event) with Kang Neung-Hwa, Jung Ryang-Woong, Kim Chang-Ho and Kim Jung-Sam.

See also
 List of table tennis players
 List of World Table Tennis Championships medalists

References

North Korean male table tennis players
World Table Tennis Championships medalists
20th-century North Korean people